The National Capital Region Transport Corporation (NCRTC) is a joint venture company of the Government of India and the states of Haryana, Rajasthan, Uttar Pradesh, and Delhi. The NCRTC is mandated with implementing the Regional Rapid Transit System (RRTS) project across the National Capital Region (NCR) to ensure balanced and sustainable urban development through better connectivity and access.

The Union Cabinet approved formation of the NCRTC under the Companies Act, 1956, in July 2013. The NCRTC was charged with designing, developing, implementing, financing, operating, and maintaining the RRTS in the NCR to provide comfortable and fast transit to NCR towns and to meet the high growth in demand for rapid transport options in the region. The NCRTC was incorporated on 21 August 2013 and Vinay Kumar Singh was appointed as the first regular managing director of the NCRTC in July 2016.

Out of eight RRTS corridors identified and targeted for development prior to the formation of the NCRTC, the following three were prioritized for implementation by India's Planning Commission:
 Delhi-Ghaziabad-Meerut
 Delhi-Gurugram-SNB-Alwar
 Delhi-Panipat

History

Background

During 1998–1999, a study commissioned by Indian Railways  was carried out to identify requirements for commuter rail projects in the National Capital Region (NCR) and Delhi. The study proposed the Regional Rapid Transit System (RRTS) for connecting NCR towns to Delhi with fast commuter trains. The proposal was re-examined in 2006 in light of the Metro extension to a number of NCR towns.

According to the Ministry of Housing and Urban Affairs official website, the central government approved the formation of the NCRTC in 2003 under the Companies Act, 1956, with initial seed capital of Rs. 100 crore for designing, developing, implementing, financing, operating, and maintaining the RRTS in order to provide comfortable and fast transit to NCR towns and meet the high growth in transport demand. The equity holders of the NCRTC are the Ministry of Urban Development (22.5%), Ministry of Railways (22.5%), National Capital Region Planning Board (5.0%), Government of NCT of Delhi (5.0%), Government of Uttar Pradesh (12.5%), Government of Rajasthan (12.5%), and Government of Haryana (12.5%). This company may further form subsidiary companies for implementing each corridor.

In 2005, the Planning Commission formed a task force, chaired by the Secretary of the Ministry of Urban Development (MoUD), to develop a plan for a multi-modal transport system for the NCR. This was included in the Integrated Transport Plan for NCR 2032, emphasizing the RRTS to connect the regional centres.

The task force identified eight corridors and prioritised three, namely Delhi-Ghaziabad-Meerut, Delhi-Panipat, and Delhi-Gurugram-SNB-Alwar for implementation. In March 2010, the National Capital Region Planning Board (NCRPB) appointed M/S Delhi Integrated Multi-Modal Transit System to carry out feasibility studies and prepare "detailed project reports" for the Delhi-Ghaziabad-Meerut and Delhi-Panipat corridors, and M/S Urban Mass Transit Company Limited to do the same for the Delhi-Gurugram-SNB-Alwar corridor.

History of the NCRTC
The Union Cabinet approved the establishment of the National Capital Region Transport Corporation Limited (NCRTC) under the Companies Act, 1956, on 11 July 2013. The Cabinet allocated initial seed capital of ₹100 crores (₹1 billion) to the NCRTC for designing, developing, implementing, financing, operating, and maintaining the RRTS in the NCR, to provide comfortable and fast transit to NCR towns and meet the high growth in demand for rapid transport options in the region. The NCRTC was incorporated on 21 August 2013 and is authorized to form subsidiary companies to implement each of the corridors. The seed capital was to be contributed as follows:

Phase 1
The NCRTC board approved the Detailed Project Report (DPR) for the Delhi-Ghaziabad-Meerut RRTS corridor on 6 December 2016. Subsequent to the approval of the DPR by India's state and union governments on 8 March 2019, the prime minister of India laid the foundation stone of India's first RRTS between the cities of Delhi, Ghaziabad, and Meerut. The civil construction work is still in progress, and the priority section of the corridor between Sahibabad and Duhai is targeted to be commissioned by 2023. Once the RRTS is operational, travel time between Delhi and Meerut will be reduced to less than sixty minutes from the current three hours.

Construction of the second prioritized RRTS corridor along the Delhi-Gurugram-SNB-Alwar route is planned to be carried out in three stages. The DPR for the first stage, the Delhi-Gurugram-SNB segment, was approved by the NCRTC board on 6 December 2018. Subsequently, the Governments of Haryana, Rajasthan, and NCT Delhi, approved the DPR for the corridor as well, and it is currently under active consideration by the government of India. The DPR for the second stage of this corridor, between SNB (Shahjahanpur-Neemrana-Behror Urban Complex) and Sotanala, was approved by the NCRTC board on 13 March 2020.

The DPR of the third prioritized RRTS corridor, between Delhi and Panipat, was approved by the NCRTC board on 13 March 2020.

The NCRTC unveiled an initial look of India's first RRTS on 25 September 2020. The RRTS prototype was scheduled to roll off the production line in 2022 and to be put into public use after extensive trials.

RRTS overview
 RRTS is a rail-based semi-high speed, high frequency, high capacity, comfortable, air-conditioned, reliable, and safe commuter service connecting regional nodes.
 Design speed – 180 km/h, Operational speed – 160 km/h, Average speed of 100 km/h – Delhi to Meerut in less than 55 minutes (three times the speed of Metro)
 Train every ~5–10 minutes; serving traffic nodes at every 5–10 km
 ETCS-2 Signalling System along with centralized operations control will ensure that train services will not be affected, even during extreme weather conditions.
 RRTS is different from conventional railway as it will provide reliable, high frequency, point-to-point regional travel at high speed along a dedicated pathway.
 RRTS is different from Metro as it caters to passengers looking to travel relatively longer distances with fewer stops and at a higher speed. Metro rail projects generally serve the need of intra-city movement and operate within metropolitan cities like Delhi, Chennai, or Kochi; RRTS will connect suburban and urban centres in the NCR and will run from one city centre to another, thus providing a seamless transit network to the entire region.
 Aerodynamic trains with airline-like transverse seating arrangements.

Unique aspects of RRTS
Interoperability

Wait times and train changes are two major deterrents to the adoption of any public transport system. To provide commuters with convenient, seamless travel experiences, the three phase-1 RRTS corridors, Delhi – Ghaziabad – Meerut; Delhi – Panipat; and Delhi – Gurugram – SNB – Alwar, will converge at Delhi's Sarai Kale Khan and will be interoperable, in the sense that trains will be able to move from one corridor to another. This will facilitate commuter travel from one corridor station to another without requiring train changes, thus motivating commuters to leave their private vehicles and switch to the RRTS.

Multimodal integration

Wherever possible, RRTS stations will be integrated with other modes of public transport, such as airports, Indian Railway stations, inter-state bus terminals, and Delhi Metro stations. Such integration will facilitate seamless commuter transfers from one mode of public transportation to another, thereby encouraging use of public transport systems. While the RRTS will act as a backbone for regional transportation, Delhi Metro lines will complement the RRTS by providing feeder lines. The Sarai Kale Khan RRTS station will be a mega-terminal where all three Phase-I RRTS corridors will merge.

Business class: Each RRTS train will have a separate business coach. This will encourage business class commuters to switch to public transport for intercity travel.

Comfortable travel: The air-conditioned RRTS coaches will have transverse seating arrangements with overhead luggage space and wi-fi connections, among other modern amenities.

Women's coach: Each RRTS train will have a separate coach for women travellers, just like the Delhi Metro.

Universal accessibility: The entire infrastructure of the RRTS, including stations and trains, will be designed with universal accessibility in mind.

Need for the RRTS project
The National Capital Region (NCR) has grown over the years to cover parts of states around Delhi, namely Haryana, Uttar Pradesh, and Rajasthan. Today, the total area falling under the NCR is about 55,083 km2 , with a total population of over 46 million (4.6 crores) (2011 census). The region saw roughly 24% growth over a single decade, between 2001 and 2011. The entire NCR is formed by a collection of urban areas, with an urbanization rate of about 62%.

Further, in 2007, the number of passenger vehicles crossing Delhi borders surpassed 1,100,000 (eleven lakhs) per day. Rail-based inter- regional commuter demand in the NCR is estimated to grow to 1.7 million passengers per day by 2032. This has triggered the need for an effective regional public transport system.

Benefits of the RRTS project

Enhanced economic activity
A high-speed, comfortable, and affordable mode of transport such as the RRTS has the potential to change the movement patterns of people and usher in economic development across the region. With reduced travel times, the overall productivity of the region would increase, leading to improved overall economic activity and balanced economic development. The RRTS would lead to uniform polycentric (across multiple centers) economic development across the region.

Lower emissions
With a reduced number of private vehicles on the roads and a shift towards a clean transportation system like the RRTS, fuel consumption is expected to go down. Low fuel consumption means lower emissions and less pollution.

Easing of road congestion
The RRTS has the capacity to ferry a large number of people each hour. By shifting a large portion of commuter traffic from road to rail, it could free up road space and ease congestion on highways across the NCR. The Delhi–Ghaziabad–Gurugram RRTS corridor alone is expected to remove over one lakh (one hundred thousand) vehicles from the road, easing overall congestion.

Improved access to jobs and facilities
Development and running of the three phase-1 corridors alone are expected to generate 21,000 direct jobs. The RRTS is expected to open up new markets and opportunities for people by connecting them through a high-speed transportation network. The faster commute will provide people with access to better services and facilities in many areas, such as healthcare and education.

Travel time and cost savings
The high-speed journey through the RRTS will be offered at an affordable price, leading to savings on the part of commuters.

Reduced energy use
With a small land footprint and high throughput, implementation of the Delhi–Ghaziabad–Meerut RRTS corridor is expected to shift the modal share in favour of public transport in the region, from 37% to 63%. A shift towards public transportation will reduce energy use by the transport sector in the National Capital Region. This would not only lead to reduced fuel consumption in the region, but also decrease the country's dependence on imported foreign oil.

Technology
The NCRTC is implementing a state-of-the-art rail-based rapid transit system in the NCR with a design speed of 180 km/h. Such a design speed will necessarily require installation of grade-separated tracks and the latest signalling and control systems, to ensure high throughput and safe operation. The rolling stock (train cars) will be air-conditioned and capable of fast acceleration and deceleration in a very short time span. Traction power will be delivered through a uniquely designed 25 kV flexible overhead catenary traction system for elevated stations and a rigid overhead catenary system for tunnels. Key technologies:

Ballastless track
A Slab Track Austria system, recognized for providing excellent riding comfort even at high speeds of 180 km/h. These tracks are being used in India for the first time. The tracks are also preferred for their longer life span, reduced maintenance requirements, and ease of replacement.

ETCS Level 2 signalling system
The ETCS Level-2 signalling system is used globally for high-speed railway transit. The system is equipped with modern signalling with virtual blocks & ATO functionality over an LTE backbone and is being used for the first time in India. A key feature of the RRTS is interoperability of all the corridors, and ETCS Level-2 makes this possible. The system can monitor train speed and direction and provide operational directives using a radio block centre. Use of a virtual block facilitated by ETCS Level-2 signalling eliminates any possibility of train collision.

SPEED – Systematic Program Evaluation for Efficient Delivery of project
SPEED is NCRTC's in-house, sophisticated, robust, reliable, and user-friendly monitoring and project management platform for reporting activities of the pre-construction and construction phases of the RRTS. SPEED leverages technological infrastructure frameworks such as JavaScript, PHP, etc.

Common Data Environment (CDE)
A CDE is implemented to maintain a common repository for all construction and pre-construction drawings and technical documents. It enables collaboration and sharing of updated information, documents, and drawings in real time to achieve a single source of truth across an organisation, manage design, define and implement workflows, and monitor progress actions across the organisation.

Building Information Modelling (BIM)
BIM is an intelligent 3D model-based process that provides architecture, engineering, and construction professionals the insight and tools to more effectively plan, design, construct, and manage buildings, infrastructure, and outdoor structures and elements. Project-related components like walls, doors, etc. are modelled in 3D using various BIM software. BIM offers a realistic 3D model, giving a true sense of how the actual structure will look. Currently, all the RRTS stations are being designed and developed using a BIM platform.

Continuously Operating Reference Stations (CORS)
A CORS network system, including its control station, is being installed by the NCRTC to increase geolocation accuracy in the civil construction survey work. This system provides real-time, precise coordinates for measured locations and is capable of ensuring 5 – 10 mm accuracy in the geolocation of points, whereas regular GPS can only provide location accuracy of up to 10 to 15 metres. This eliminates cumulative errors in civil construction and results in better alignment, acting as a life cycle management solution for the project.

Rolling stock

Rolling stock will be provided by Alstom for the  Delhi–Meerut Regional Rapid Transit System and will be manufactured in Gujarat. The project scope involves supplying thirty regional commuter trainsets of six cars each and ten intracity mass transit trainsets of three cars each, together with fifteen years of rolling stock maintenance. The Letter of Award is valued at approximately ₹2,577 crore (€314 million, $340 million US) and the customer has a provision to exercise an option of an additional ninety cars and two years of maintenance. The design speed will be 180 km/h but will run at 160 km/h. The bogies will be based on the Bombardier Transportation FLEXX Bogie family, and the propulsion system will be based on MITRAC Propulsion.

Network

Phase 1 (under construction)

Phase 2 (proposed)
Corridors identified for second phase, with no budgetary approval as of July 2017, are:

Implementation
The RRTS currently proposed by the government will have a travel time of one hour for Delhi–Panipat and Delhi–Meerut, and two hours for Delhi–Alwar. This will result in facilitating seamless travel between the CBD and NCR suburbs. Recently, all state governments have approved alignments of the three Regional Rapid Transit System (RRTS) corridors. These corridors will connect the capital with Panipat, Meerut, and Alwar. These three alignments were recommended by the National Capital Regional Planning Board (NCRPB).

In its 36th meeting, held under the chairmanship of Union Urban Development Minister Venkaiah Naidu, the NCRPB gave the nod to the implementation of three RRTS corridors—Delhi–Alwar, Delhi–Panipat, and Delhi–Meerut. Further, Minister Naidu stated that issues related to the Regional Rapid Transit System (RRTS) have been resolved and further work on these three corridors could be started immediately. The minister also said that a managing director, entrusted with the implementation of the RRTS, had been appointed and implementation of the RRTS corridors will commence shortly. Indian Railways officer Shri. Vinay Kumar Singh has been appointed as the managing director of the company and assumed office in July 2016.

See also
 Future of rail transport in India
 Rapid transit in India
 Railway in Haryana
 List of state highways in Uttar Pradesh

References

External links
 
 NCR RRTS complete masterplan for eight corridors
 NCR RRTS route map
 NCR RRTS routes
 Delhi–Panipat RRTS map
 imageshack.us
 archive.indianexpress.com
 Revised NCRPB transport plan, approved in 2013, Indian Environmental portal
 Functional regional transport plan 2021, NCRPB portal
 NCR Transport, NCRPB portal

2013 establishments in Delhi
Transport in Haryana
Transport in Delhi
Transport in Noida
Transport in Faridabad
Transport in Gurgaon
Transport in Ghaziabad, Uttar Pradesh
Metropolitan transport agencies of India
National Capital Region (India)